Below is a list of By-elections held in Tamil Nadu from 1952-1995.

Lok Sabha

1993 
The by-election took place due to the death of Shri Senapathy.

1985 
The by-election took place due to the death of Shri K.T. Kosalram.

1982 
The by-election took place due to the death of Shri C.N. Natarajan.

1980 
The by-election took place due to the death of Shri Karunanithi Thazhai.

 
 
 

 
 
 

 Note: S. Singravadivel ran as a candidate with Congress (Indira faction).

1973 
The by-election took place due to the death of Shri M.Rajangam.

References

By-elections in Tamil Nadu
1980 elections in India
1982 elections in India
1985 elections in India
1993 elections in India